Asim Zeneli (3 May 1916 – 2 July 1943) was an Albanian partisan during World War II. His death against Italian troops in 1943 in Mezhgoran became a rallying point for LANÇ. Posthumously he was awarded the highest honour of the country, Hero of the People.

Biography
Born in Progonat. In the 1930s he studied at the Qemal Stafa High School, in Tirana, Albania. and then at the Military Academy of Modena. In 1939 he was arrested during the anti-Italian protests after the invasion of Albania. A member of the Albanian Communist Party, in March 1943 he became commander of the "Hajredin Tremishti" platoon and in late June commissar of the "Koto Hoxhi" platoon. He died on 2 July 1943 against the Italian army during the capture of Përmet.

Sources 

1916 births
1943 deaths
People from Tepelenë
Albanian communists
Qemal Stafa High School alumni
Albanian resistance members
Heroes of Albania